Jean Henri Diago Lhuillier (born March 24, 1969) is a Filipino businessman, diplomat and sports patron. Jean Henri is the President and CEO of the PJ Lhuillier Group of Companies, which operates and manages Cebuana Lhuillier, the largest micro financial institution in the Philippines. He is an Official Knight of the Equestrian Order of Saint Agatha conferred by Minister Pasquale Valentini of the San Marino Secretary for Foreign Affairs. He is the son of the Philippine Ambassador to Spain Philippe Jones Lhuillier and Edna Diago Lhuillier.

Education
Jean Henri graduated from Saint Mary’s College, Moraga, California, United States with a degree in Economics and Business Administration in 1992. He completed the short course for Owner/President Management in 2009 at Harvard Business School. He is also a former student of the Gemological Institute of America and received an honorary Doctor of Humanities degree from the Polytechnic University of the Philippines in 2013.

Career
He is the President and CEO of PJ Lhuillier, Inc., Cebuana Lhuillier Insurance Solutions, Cebuana Lhuillier Services Corp., Cebuana Lhuillier Financial Corp., Cebuana Lhuillier Rural Bank, Inc., Cebuana Lhuillier Foundation, Inc., Cebuana Lhuillier Marketing Services, Inc., Cebuana Lhuillier Microbusiness, Inc., Cintrée Management Services, Inc., Just Jewels Diamonds Boutique Corporation, Le Soleil De Boracay Resort, Inc., Networld Capital Ventures, Inc., Pawncare Services, Corp., P & EL Realty Corp., P.J. Lhuillier Development Corp., PJL Corporate Centre, Inc., PJL Leisure, Inc., PJL Ventures, Inc., Riche Gould Real Estate, Inc., and Verité Pawn Corp..

He is the current Director and Chairman of the Board of Global Restaurant Concepts, the Philippine franchise holder of California Pizza Kitchen, Ihop Restaurant, Applebee’s, Morelli's Gelato, and Gyu-Kaku.

He is also the Director of Enderun Colleges, Inc., DFNN Inc., Falcor Heli Solutions Philippines, Inc., HatchAsia, Inc., iWave, Inc., and Next Ideas, Inc..

Jean Henri is the current President of the Chamber of Pawnbrokers of the Philippines, Inc. (CPPI) and of the Board of Director of the Association of Philippine Private Remittance Service Companies, Inc. (APRISE). He is also an Advisory Board Member of the School of Economics and Business Administration of the St. Mary’s College of California.

He is also a commander of the 101st Auxiliary Squadron of the Philippine Coast Guard since 2005. He is also a member of the Young Presidents' Organization, the Philippine Chamber of Commerce & Industry, the American Management Association, the National Pawnbrokers' Association (USA), the Chain des Rotisseurs, the Green Hotels Association, the Project Management Institute (USA), the Institute for Supply Management (USA), the Public Relations Society of Americas, the St. Mary's College Alumni Association, the Direct Marketing Association (USA), and the International Association of Human Resource Information Management (USA).

He has recently become a member of the ASHOKA Innovators for the Public, the Paul Harris Society (Rotary Foundation of Rotary Int'l) and, a co-sponsor of the Lhuillier-Hess Scholarship, Wharton School of the University of Pennsylvania. He is also a Melvin Jones Fellow of the Lions Club International Foundation and a George F. Hixson Fellow of the Kiwanis Children’s Fund.

Involvement in Sports

Jean Henri has helped athletes in representing the Philippines in international tournaments and has supported programs that aim for the development of the youth through sports such as basketball, tennis, and softball. He was recently awarded as the Sportsman of the Year in the 36th Sportswriter Association of Cebu Awards.  He has supported the sports scene in the Philippines for more than three decades. Lhuillier was recognized for his efforts in sports grassroots development and support to national teams in softball and tennis in the country. 

He has also majorly contributed to the successful campaigns of the RP Blu Boys in the past years as well as the fruitful Tokyo 2020 Olympics campaign of the RP Blu Girls, the country’s national softball teams. He is also the main supporter of the girls under 14 and under 16 who compete each year at the WTA Future Stars competition held abroad.

He is a co-founder of the Unified Tennis Philippines (UTP) and is currently the Chairman of the Board of the Philippine Tennis Association, team manager of the Davis Cup Team Philippines, the team owner of Cebuana Lhuillier Gems, and the president of the Amateur Softball Association of the Philippines.

He also serves as the current director of Philippine Tennis Academy, team manager of Philippine men's and women's national teams. He is a member of the Professional Tennis Registry (USA), the Softball Confederation Asia, and the United States Professional Tennis Association Inc.

In recent years, he has expanded Cebuana Lhuillier sports by engaging into international sports events such as the International Premier Tennis League, the International Tennis Federation Futures and the ATP Challenger Tour. He is a co-owner of the Philippine Mavericks in the IPTL which brought players such as Serena Williams and Rafael Nadal among others to the Philippines in December 2015. He also sponsored the ATP Challenger Tour last January 2016 which featured the likes of former world number 8, Mikhail Youzhny. He also sponsored (through Cebuana Lhuillier) the 2016 and 2017 Philippine qualifying tournaments for the 16-under and 14-under WTA (Women’s Tennis Association) Future Stars.

References

Further reading 
Natad, Jessica. "Jean Henri Lhuillier". Point Cebu. 9 August 2011
"King of Pawn: Jean Henri Lhuillier". UNO Magazine. 9 August 2011.
Silver award for Executive of the Year for Diversified Services and for Insurance categories at the International Business Awards 2016
Golden Bridge Awards 2016
International Business Awards

1969 births
Living people
20th-century Filipino businesspeople
Jean Henri
Filipino diplomats
Filipino people of French descent
Businesspeople from Cebu
Saint Mary's College of California alumni
21st-century Filipino businesspeople